Hommelstø is a village in the municipality of Brønnøy in Nordland county, Norway.

The  village has a population (2013) of 289.

References

Villages in Nordland
Brønnøy

("Hommelstø", 2019)